Erik Hagen (born 20 July 1975) is a retired Norwegian footballer who played as a centre-back in Norway and Russia, as well as for the Norwegian national team, earning 28 caps.

Career

Club
During his time with Vålerenga, Hagen received the nickname "Panzer" from the club's fans. Amongst other things he created a "hate list" of Norwegian footballers in the club magazine Vål'enga Magasin, containing the likes of Vidar Riseth.

Hagen won the Kniksen Award as Defender of the Year, and as Kniksen of the Year in 2004. The Kniksen award is the highest individual award for a Norwegian footballer.

In December 2004 Hagen was sold to Zenit Saint Petersburg, becoming the first Norwegian footballer to play in Russia. In 2005, he played 28 league matches for Zenit, receiving 12 cautions. In January 2006 he was elected vice-captain by the team.

On 31 January 2008, it was announced that Hagen would be joining Premier League club Wigan Athletic, signing on loan until the end of the English season. However, he only made one appearance for the team, in the away defeat at Portsmouth.

On 28 July 2008, Hagen appeared at the Vålerenga home game against Tromsø, where it was announced he had re-signed for the club until the end of the 2010 season. The return of one of Vålerenga's most popular players was well received with supporters.

During an interview in April 2014, Hagen admitted to bribing a referee in a European match during his time with Zenit Saint Petersburg.

International career
Hagen made his debut, aged 29, for the Norwegian national team away to Scotland on 9 October 2004. Norway won 1–0.

Personal life
Hagen has a twin brother, Rune Hagen, who also plays professional football. He signed for Vålerenga at the same time as his brother.

Career statistics

Club
Source:

International
Source:

International goals

References

External links
 Club profile
 

1975 births
Living people
People from Ringerike (municipality)
Norwegian footballers
Norway international footballers
Jevnaker IF players
Hønefoss BK players
Vålerenga Fotball players
FC Zenit Saint Petersburg players
Wigan Athletic F.C. players
Eliteserien players
Premier League players
Russian Premier League players
Kniksen Award winners
Norwegian twins
Expatriate footballers in Russia
Norwegian expatriate sportspeople in Russia
Expatriate footballers in England
Norwegian expatriate sportspeople in England
Norwegian expatriate footballers
Twin sportspeople
Association football defenders
Sportspeople from Viken (county)